Criquetot-sur-Longueville is a commune in the Seine-Maritime département of the Normandy region of northern France.

Geography

Population

Places of interest
 The church of St.Julien, dating from the twelfth century.

See also
Communes of the Seine-Maritime department

Notes

Communes of Seine-Maritime